Frank Wolstencroft (23 December 1882 – 30 June 1952) was a British trade union leader.

Born in Royton in Lancashire, Wolstencroft entered work at an early age, then at the age of sixteen was apprenticed as a joiner.  He joined the Amalgamated Society of Carpenters and Joiners (ASC&J) in 1906 and was elected as its Royton branch secretary the following year. Soon, he was also serving as secretary of its Oldham district, and in 1914 he was elected to its national Executive Council.

Wolstencroft was elected as Assistant General Secretary of the ASC&J in 1920, and then in 1926 he became General Secretary of its successor, the Amalgamated Society of Woodworkers (ASW), elected by a huge majority.  This was a period of rapid growth for the union, and Wolstencroft also worked to build international links; during World War II, he was a key founder of the Anglo-Soviet Trade Union Committee.

In 1928, he was elected to the General Council of the Trades Union Congress (TUC), serving until 1949, and in 1942, he was President of the TUC.  He also served on executive of the International Union of Woodworkers and its successors, the National Insurance Advisory Committee, and the board of the Disabled Persons Employment Corporation. In 1947, he received the CBE.  He retired from the general secretaryship in 1948, becoming President of the Co-operative Press.

In his spare time, Wolstencroft enjoyed a variety of sports.

References

1882 births
1952 deaths
General Secretaries of the Amalgamated Society of Woodworkers
People from Royton
Presidents of the Trades Union Congress